Henrik Haukeland (born 6 December 1994) is a Norwegian professional ice hockey player currently playing for Düsseldorfer EG in the Deutsche Eishockey Liga (DEL). He is also a member of the Norwegian national team.

He participated at the 2017 IIHF World Championship and 2018 IIHF World Championship.

Awards 
 Leksands IF:
 Allsvenskan to SHL Promotion, 2015–16
 Timrå IK:
 Allsvenskan Best GAA (1.72)
 Allsvenskan Best SVS% (.929)
 Allsvenskan Goalie of the Year
 Allsvenskan to SHL Promotion, 2017–18 
 KooKoo:
 SM-liiga Player of the Month, (January) 2019–20

References

External links

1994 births
Living people
IF Björklöven players
Düsseldorfer EG players
Sportspeople from Fredrikstad
Färjestad BK players
HC TPS players
KooKoo players
Leksands IF players
EHC München players
Norwegian ice hockey goaltenders
Norwegian expatriate ice hockey people
Norwegian expatriate sportspeople in Finland
Norwegian expatriate sportspeople in Sweden
Ice hockey players at the 2018 Winter Olympics
Olympic ice hockey players of Norway
Stjernen Hockey players